Enrico Zuccalli (Johann Heinrich Zuccalli; c. 1642 – 8 March 1724) was a Swiss architect who worked for the Wittelsbach regents of Bavaria and Cologne.

Biography
Zuccalli was born in Roveredo, Switzerland.  From 1669 he lived in Munich and became a major representative of the introduction of Italian Baroque architecture to Germany. He was a bitter rival of another Swiss architect, Giovanni Antonio Viscardi. In 1672 Zuccalli became chief architect of the Bavarian court as successor of Agostino Barelli and remained in office until the Austrian invasion of Bavaria in 1706. He died in Munich.

He was the uncle of (Giovanni) Gaspare Zuccalli who built two churches at Salzburg.

Chief works

 Theatinerkirche (Munich) since 1674 (completing the work of Barelli)
 Residenz, Munich (1680–1701)
 Lustheim Palace (1684–1689)
 Palais Porcia in Munich (1694)
 Electoral Palace of Bonn (1697–1702) (later completed by de Cotte)
 Schleissheim Palace (1701–1704) (later completed by Effner)
 Re-built Ettal Abbey (1709–26)

References

Further reading
Sabin Heym: Henrico Zuccalli: der kurbayerische Hofbaumeister. Schnell und Steiner. München/Zürich 1984, 
Norbert Hierl-Deronco: Es ist eine Lust zu bauen. Von Bauherren, Bauleuten und vom Bauen im Barock in Kurbayern - Franken - Rheinland. Krailling 2001, 
 Richard A. L. Paulus: Der Baumeister Henrico Zuccalli. Strassburg 1912

1640s births
1724 deaths
People from Moesa District
German Baroque architects
Swiss Baroque architects
Architects of the Bavarian court
18th-century Swiss architects
17th-century Swiss architects